Shake It Up: Break It Down (known as Shake It Up: Dance Dance internationally ) is the debut soundtrack from the first season (2010-2011) of Disney Channel hit original series, Shake It Up. It was released on July 12, 2011 as a 2 Disc CD + DVD combo, with the DVD showing the dance steps. It has peaked at number 22 on the US Billboard 200 and topped the US Billboard Top Soundtracks and the US Billboard Kid Albums. Elsewhere, it has peaked at number 65 in Mexico.

Singles
"Shake It Up" by Selena Gomez was released as first promotional single and peaked at number 9 on the U.S. Billboard Bubbling Under Hot 100 Singles chart and is also serves as the series theme song. "Watch Me" by Bella Thorne and Zendaya, was released as lead single and peaked at number 86 on U.S. Billboard Hot 100.

Track listing

Critical reception

Andrew Leahey of AllMusic gave a review: Released toward the end of Shake It Ups first season, this soundtrack features 14 songs from the hit Disney series, as well as a bonus DVD of step-by-step dance routines. Selena Gomez sings the title song, while actresses Bella Thorne and Zendaya perform the album's second single, "Watch Me".

Commercial performance
It peaked at number 22 on the US Billboard 200 and topped the US Billboard Top Soundtracks and the US Billboard Kid Albums. Elsewhere, it peaked at number 65 in Mexico.

Charts

Certifications

"Shake It Up" song

"Shake It Up" is a song recorded by American singer and actress Selena Gomez. The song was written and produced by Jeannie Lurie, Aris Archontis and Chen Neeman for Shake It Up: Break It Down, the soundtrack to the Disney Channel TV series Shake It Up and served as the theme song of the series. The song was released as a promotional single on October 24, 2010, by Walt Disney Records and peaked at number 65 on the US Billboard Digital Songs chart.

Track listing
Digital download
 "Shake It Up" — 2:55
 "Shake It Up (Cole Plante Reboot Remix) — 3:33

Release history

References

External links
 

Shake It Up (American TV series)
2011 soundtrack albums
Pop soundtracks
Television soundtracks
Walt Disney Records soundtracks